Eduardo Gottardi (born October 18, 1985 in Encantado, Rio Grande do Sul), is a Brazilian footballer who plays as a goalkeeper. He currently plays for Portuguese Primeira Liga side Marítimo.

Gottardi previously played for Portuguesa in the Campeonato Brasileiro.

References

1985 births
Sportspeople from Rio Grande do Sul
Living people
Brazilian footballers
Associação Portuguesa de Desportos players
Sport Club Internacional players
U.D. Leiria players
C.D. Nacional players
Primeira Liga players
Brazilian expatriate footballers
Expatriate footballers in Portugal
Brazilian expatriate sportspeople in Portugal
Association football goalkeepers